Pratibandhaka (Sanskrit:प्रतिबन्धक)  variously means – 'opposition', 'resistance', 'investment', 'blockade', 'siege', 'invariable and inseparable  connection', 'cessation', 'disappointment';  it also means – 'impediment', 'obstacle', 'cognitive blocker', 'antidote' or 'preventive measure'. Pratibandhaka is a causal dependency  and refers to something that must perform the specific function of obstructing.

Jaina concept of causal power

Prabhachandra, the disciple of Akalarika, endorses the Jaina argument that the causal complex has the causal power of producing effect owing to the existence of some extra-sensory power ( shakti ), that the hindrance in the origination of an effect is caused by counter-agents (pratibandhaka) is due to the special power. The followers of Jainism believe that the universe is full of karmic molecules whose mundane inflow towards the soul is caused by its own vibratory activities through mind, speech and body. Karma is the invisible power that explains causality, and the matter that binds the soul as a result of actions. But the notion of some power connected with causation is rejected by the Nyaya school which school concludes that a cognitive state is perceptible only when all causal conditions are present, abhava is perceived only in constructive cognitive state. The Mimamsakas hold the view the power connected with causation can be destroyed by the presence of an antidote (pratibandhaka) and can be resuscitated by an antidote to the antidote.

Pervasion as ground for inference and Pratibandhaka

Pervasion (vyapti) is the logical ground for inference which is a valid means of knowledge, and guarantees the truth of conclusion.  It is the unconditional and constant concomitant relationship between the pervaded and the pervade. Any person desiring emancipation (a mumuksu) cannot gain liberation (moksha) without surmounting the obstacles (pratibandhakas) related to the connection with the body in the form of powerful and wicked actions or sinful deeds (pāpa). The physical body (prakṛti), by itself, is an obstacle to the union with the Supreme Being for it has within it imprisoned the self (ātman).

Gangesa’s theory of pervasion and role of Pratibandhaka

Gangesa, the author of Tattvacintāmaṇi who had examined the possibility of dialectical reasoning as a way to grasp pervasion, in the anumāna-khanda of the same text states that pervasion is pursued so long as there is doubt because there is contradiction but does not require deviation; doubt is an invalid cognitive act and fallacious reasoning is the ground for contradiction, the nature of doubt and fallacious reasoning both being conceptual is not of determinate character . Thus, dialectical reasoning is blocking of the opposing view and continues so long as doubt persists. Gangesa agrees that since pervasion is a universal invariant concomitance, therefore, the possibility of a counter example cannot be ruled out, and concludes that contradiction as natural opposition cannot block an infinite regress, it is the doubter’s own behaviour proving the lie to the doubt that blocks it acting as the pratibandhaka. Gangesa uses the term, pratibandhaka, to refer to a natural opposition in cognitive logic, as a preventer. Pervasion by its absence is the cause of hindrance (pratibandhaka) to inferential knowledge which in turn is the cause of pervasion. Even though both grasp their objects directly, in savikalpa its contents become objects of reflective awareness which is not the case in nirvikalpa. Contradiction occurs only when one epistemic state is blocked by a pratibandhaka.

Gangesa has defined inferential knowledge as the cognition generated by cognition of a property belonging to a locus and qualified by a pervasion. A seed remaining intact does not sprout, and the destruction of the seed is a condition for the sprout to arise, the former is the obstacle (pratibandhaka) to sprout, and the latter indicates the absence of such obstacle.

Vedic view of Pratibandhaka

According to Advaita Vedanta, obstruction (pratibandhaka) of superimposition (adhyasa) is true knowledge, the absence of which obstruction is lack of true knowledge or ignorance (ajñāna or avidyā). Pratibandhaka is that obstacle which prevents the production of an effect in causal conditions.  According to the Nyaya school an effect is the counter-entity of its own prior non-existence and a fresh beginning. Swami Vidyaranya lists four such obstacles or impediments, which are:-

प्रतिबन्धो वर्तमानो विषयासक्त्तिलक्षणः | 
प्रज्ञामान्द्यं कुतर्कश्च विपर्ययदुराग्रहः ||

a) binding attachment to the objects of the senses, b) dullness of the intellect, c) indulgence in improper and illogical arguments and d) the deep conviction that the Self is an agent and an enjoyer (Panchadasi IX.43). He explains:-

शमाद्यैः श्रवणाद्यैश्च तत्र तत्रोचितैः क्षयम् |
नीतेऽस्मिन्प्रतिबन्धेऽतः स्वस्य ब्रह्मत्वमश्नुते ||

that through the practice of inner control and other qualifications and through hearing the truth and so forth, suitable for counter-acting the impediments, the latter slowly perish, and one realizes his Self as Brahman (Panchadasi IX.44). The Yogi enters into the heaven of meritorious because of his practice of enquiry provided his enquiry is not impeded on account of the results of past evil deeds and his strong desire for Brahmaloka is not suppressed by him. 
  
In Ayurveda, the word pratibandhaka as vyādhyutpāda pratibandhaka refers to the power of the body to resist disease which power (vyādhi virodhaka) when weakened can be restored by means of administering triphala fruits and the likes as an herbal rasayana.

References

Hindu philosophical concepts
History of logic
!
Vedas
Vedanta
Jain philosophy